Caldwell House may refer to:

in Singapore
 Caldwell House, Singapore, a historical building at the CHIJMES complex in Singapore

in the United Kingdom
 Caldwell House, East Renfrewshire, Scotland, Category A listed building

in the United States
(sorted by state, then city/town)
 Caldwell House (McRae, Arkansas), listed on the National Register of Historic Places (NRHP) in White County
 James Caldwell House, Campbellsville, Kentucky, listed on the NRHP in Taylor County
 Caldwell House (Danville, Kentucky), listed on the NRHP in Boyle County
 Charles W. Caldwell House, Danville, Kentucky, listed on the NRHP in Boyle County
 W. Logan Caldwell Farmstead, Danville Kentucky, listed on the NRHP in Boyle County
 Caldwell House (Shelbyville, Kentucky), listed on the NRHP in Shelby County
 Caldwell House (Abbeville, Louisiana), listed on the NRHP in Vermilion Parish
 Caldwell-Cobb-Love House, Lincolnton, North Carolina, listed on the NRHP in Lincoln County
 Luther Henry Caldwell House, Lumberton, North Carolina, listed on the NRHP in Robeson County
 Samuel Caldwell House, Caldwell, Ohio, listed on the NRHP in Noble County
 Caldwell-Hampton-Boylston House, Columbia, South Carolina, listed on the NRHP in Richland County
 W. A. Caldwell House, Brookings, South Dakota, listed on the NRHP in Brookings County
 William Parker Caldwell House, Gardner, Tennessee, listed on the NRHP in Weakley County
 Caldwell-Hopson House, Tiptonville, Tennessee, listed on the NRHP in Lake County
 Caldwell Lustron House, Union City, Tennessee, listed on the NRHP in Obion County
 Caldwell House (San Marcos, Texas), listed on the NRHP in Hayes County